Brian Christopher Button (born February 2, 1984), better known by the ring name Brian Cage, is an American professional wrestler and bodybuilder signed to All Elite Wrestling (AEW). Cage also performs in AEW's sister promotion Ring of Honor (ROH), where he is part of The Embassy and currently one-third of the ROH World Six-Man Tag Team Champions. In AEW, he is a former FTW Champion. He also competes on the independent circuit.

Button was hired by World Wrestling Entertainment in 2008 and was assigned to their farm territory Florida Championship Wrestling, where he worked as Kris Logan. He left the promotion the following year and began working in the American independent circuit, most notably Pro Wrestling Guerrilla as Brian Cage-Taylor. In 2014, Button was hired to appear in El Rey Network television series Lucha Underground, where he performed as Cage. Since Lucha Underground was created by Mexican promotion Lucha Libre AAA Worldwide, he appeared on several AAA shows. Also, Cage appeared on AAA's American partner Impact Wrestling where he is a former Impact World Champion and a former Impact X Division Champion.

Early life
Brian Christopher Button was born on February 2, 1984, in Chico, California. He is a 2002 graduate of Pleasant Valley High School, the same year as Aaron Rodgers.

Professional wrestling career

Early career (2004–2008)
Cage's love of professional wrestling and desire to be a wrestler began with watching it on television as a child. During those early years Cage became friends with the late Chris Kanyon following a show that was held in Sacramento at Arco Arena where he made a sign that Kanyon noticed. Kanyon then became Cage's biggest advocate in his decision to pursue professional wrestling as a career. This eventually led to him and his friends starting their own Federation in 2004 called Main-Event Wrestling Federation (MWF) in Chico, California. Cage's wrestling debut happened at an MWF show, against Kanyon. This eventually led to a second show where Kanyon once again faced Cage. Cage ended up winning both matches against Kanyon. During this time, Cage had been training at Pro Championship Wrestling. Also, Cage competed at All Pro Wrestling. This continued until Cage, under Kanyon's advice, left to move to Atlanta to be in WWE's then developmental territory Deep South Wrestling.

While not officially signed with Deep South Wrestling, Cage competed in matches with other WWE wrestlers.  When WWE ended its ties with DSW, Cage left to come back to California. However, before Cage left, Kanyon asked Cage to become Mortis so that someday if Kanyon ever decided to make a comeback that he could still have his name out there. Cage is the only person other than Kanyon that has portrayed the Mortis character.

Cage again came back to California and worked with promotions such as All Pro Wrestling, Supreme Pro Wrestling, and Fog City Wrestling.

Florida Championship Wrestling (2008–2009)
In June 2008, WWE signed Cage to a developmental contract, he reported  to their developmental territory Florida Championship Wrestling, based in Tampa. When Cage first started with FCW he was using the name Brian Cage but was eventually asked to change it and came up with the name Kris Logan. The name Kris Logan was made to give homage to Chris Kanyon, with the Logan part due to his similar appearance to the Marvel Comics character Wolverine, along with the outfit that he wore which sported yellow tights with claw marks. On July 23, 2009, Logan and Justin Gabriel defeated The Dude Busters (Caylen Croft and Trent Barreta) to become FCW Florida Tag Team Champions. However, they lost the title that same night against The Rotundos (Bo Rotundo and Duke Rotundo). Later, Cage would then come up with a new character Night Claw. The Night Claw character was seen in a few matches and was supposed to be used during the time that Hurricane was still active in WWE. However, this did not occur as Cage was eventually released from his contract in September 2009.

Return to independent circuit (2009–2020)

Upon his release from WWE, Cage returned to the independent wrestling circuit and even competed in Asia. Cage would return to the Main Event Wrestling wrestling promotion where he would win the Main Event Wrestling California Cup where he beat Ryan Taylor, Joey Ryan, and finally T.J. Perkins. In October 2010, Cage wrestled and won a match against Kenny Dykstra at Main Event Wrestling in internet pay-per-view.

Cage would then join the NWA Hollywood promotion where he would team up with Shaun Ricker to form the tag team Natural Selection managed by Percy Pringle III.  Towards the end of 2011, the team would split as Cage would feud with Ricker and would leave Cage as a single competitor.

Cage has also competed in other various promotions such as Future Stars of Wrestling. Cage had a feud with Brandon Gatson who would then compete against in a match on January 21, 2012, that was called the Match of the Year.

In May 2017, Cage started working for Japanese promotion Pro Wrestling Noah. On July 27, Cage unsuccessfully challenged Katsuhiko Nakajima for the GHC Heavyweight Championship.

Pro Wrestling Guerrilla (2010–2017)
Cage made his Pro Wrestling Guerrilla debut on July 30, 2010, against Brandon Bonham at Seven in a losing effort. In his next match, he lost once more to Bonham in the 2010 Battle of Los Angeles opening round. Soon after, Cage would form a stable with Chuck Taylor and Ryan Taylor known as the Fightin' Taylor Boys, adding the last name to his own and becoming Brian Cage-Taylor. The group found occasional success (with Brian and Ryan doing most of the teaming), but were never challengers to the PWG World Tag Team Championship.

At Death to All But Metal on May 25, 2012, Cage (no longer using the "Taylor" moniker) received his first PWG World Championship title shot against champion Kevin Steen. At Threemendous III on July 21, Cage defeated Eddie Edwards before interfering in Kevin Steen's title defense against Willie Mack, attacking both men. On September 1, on the first night of the 2012 Battle of Los Angeles, Cage defeated B-Boy to advance to the quarterfinal round before interfering in yet another Steen match, causing a non-title loss against Ricochet. The following day, Cage was eliminated from the tournament by Michael Elgin, following interference from Steen. At Failure to Communicate on October 27, Cage defeated Willie Mack, with whom he had been feuding since July.

On January 12, 2013, Cage and Michael Elgin formed a team called the Unbreakable F'n Machines (a name derived from both wrestlers' nicknames) and participated in the 2013 Dynamite Duumvirate Tag Team Title Tournament. In the opening round, they captured the PWG World Tag Team Championship by beating the previous year's winners, the Super Smash Bros. (Player Uno and Stupefied). The Unbreakable F'n Machines then lost the championship to The Young Bucks (Matt and Nick Jackson) in the semifinal round of the tournament later that same day.

Total Nonstop Action Wrestling (2012–2014)
Cage initially made an appearance for Total Nonstop Action Wrestling (TNA) on August 30, 2012 competing in a tryout dark match against Robbie E in a losing effort. The following year, Cage made another appearance on the January 10, 2013 edition of Impact Wrestling in another tryout match but through the company's short lived TNA Gut Check program in a losing effort against Jay Bradley. Cage would make another appearance in the year of 2014 during the summer at the June 26 Destination X taping special (aired the following month on July 31 in tape delay) in a triple threat match competing against Sanada and Crazzy Steve to qualify in the next round for the vacant TNA X Division Championship, but in a losing effort.

Lucha Underground (2014–2018)
On October 5, 2014, it was reported that Cage had signed with Lucha Underground. He debuted under the ring name Cage at the October 18 tapings winning a 4-way Elimination Match against Aero Star, Argenis and Angélico which was broadcast on January 14, 2015. Though he started the night seemingly as a dominant face, by the end of the night he attacked Prince Puma, cementing his status as a dominant heel. On the January 28 broadcast Cage received a shot at Puma's Lucha Underground Championship, but lost by disqualification, laying out both Puma and his manager Konnan afterwards. Weeks later, Cage defeated Puma in a non-title match to earn himself another title opportunity. The title match took place on the March 25 episode in a street fight, which saw Puma retain his title against Cage. He then started a feud against The Mack and defeated him in a "Falls Count Anywhere Match" at Ultima Lucha. In Season 2 of Lucha underground, Cage turned face and set his sights on Johnny Mundo.  Mundo tried to attack Cage after his victory over the debuting Joey Ryan only for Cage to turn the tables and hit him with his Weapon X finisher on the 2/17 edition of Lucha Underground.  The two subsequently faced each other a week later, with Mundo winning after a distraction from the debuting Taya. Cage was defeated by Matanza Cueto for the Lucha Underground Championship. Cage defeated Texano in the best of seven series which he won a gauntlet.

Lucha Libre AAA Worldwide (2015–present)
On February 27, 2015, Cage made his debut for the Mexican promotion Lucha Libre AAA Worldwide (AAA), pinning AAA Mega Champion El Patrón Alberto in a six-man tag team main event. On April 1, Cage defeated Alberto again with help from La Sociedad in a match that was originally scheduled to take place at Rey de Reyes. After the match, Cage demanded a shot at Alberto's title. The title match took place on June 14 at Verano de Escándalo, where Alberto was victorious via disqualification, afterwards demanding a steel cage Lucha de Apuestas with Cage. On August 9 at Triplemanía XXIII, Cage was defeated by Alberto in a Lucha de Apuestas and was afterwards, as per stipulation, forced to have his head shaved.

Return to Impact Wrestling (2018–2020)

X Division Champion (2018–2019)
On January 11, 2018, Cage re-signed with TNA, now known as Impact Wrestling. On the February 15 episode of Impact!, Cage made his in-ring debut against John Cruz in a decisive victory. At Slammiversary XVI, Cage defeated Matt Sydal to win the Impact X Division Championship. On the July 26 episode of Impact!, Cage made his first successful title defense in a rematch against Sydal. Cage also successfully defended his title against Fénix on the August 30 episode of Impact!, and against Rich Swann on the October 18 episode of Impact!. At Bound for Glory, Cage teamed with Fénix and Pentagón Jr. against Ohio Versus Everything, which they lost after Sami Callihan pinned Cage, thus ending his undefeated streak. On the November 15 episode of Impact Wrestling, Cage successfully retained the X Division Championship against Callihan.

During the November tapings of Impact Wrestling, Cage would invoke "Option C" a choice open only to the X Division Championship holder, where they surrender the title, in favor of receiving a title match for the Impact World Championship at Homecoming on January 6, 2019, where he lost to champion Johnny Impact.

Impact World Champion (2019–2020)
On the March 15 episode of Impact, Cage saved Johnny Impact from Killer Kross and Moose, but Impact turned on Cage after Impact's wife Taya Valkyrie would low blow Cage allowing Impact to attack him.

Part of the ongoing feud involved the referee Johnny Bravo where two weeks prior to the Rebellion show, it emerged that he now had allegiances to Johnny Impact and Wife Taya Valkyrie as he chop-blocked Cage when Cage was in a position to pick up a pinfall win over Impact. The previous week Bravo screwed Cage in a match with Killer Kross where he called for the bell indicating a successful pinfall when it was clear to the Audience & commentators present and the TV viewers at home that Cage had barely got a shoulder up before the referee hit the mat with his hand for the third count.

At Impact Wrestling Rebellion PPV on April 28, Cage defeated Impact and became Impact World Champion for the first time. Following the match, he was attacked by the debuting Michael Elgin. During the match Cage suffered a back injury after a Spanish Fly from the ramp to the arena floor. Due to the injury, Cage missed two days of television tapings that took place over the following week. He returned to the ring on May 12.

On the Impact TV broadcasts Cage made his return at Slammiversary  where he would once again face Michael Elgin. Despite being successful in his title defense, Cage once again was to be sidelined, with the show highlighting the cause as the same Back Injury which had limited him to just the once defense since he captured the title from Johnny Impact. Cage would not be seen at the arena events for some time with sporadic updates from his on-screen girlfriend Melissa Santos. Cage was next seen during the August and September tapings.

During the Las Vegas tapings Cage announced that he was medically cleared to return to the ring at Bound for Glory where he would be facing new number one contender Sami Callihan. As part of the buildup to the match, Callihan confronted Cage, interrupting his "first dance" in the ring with Melissa after their on-screen wedding earlier in the broadcast. Following a vile insult, Cage started to attack Callihan, who attempted to strike Cage with a bottle he was holding, but Melissa Santos instead took a direct Hit from Callihan. At the PPV Cage was able to retain his title; however, on the October 25, 2019, tapings, Callihan invoked a re-match clause, with the match held in a steel cage. Cage lost the title by pin-fall following a Super Pile-Driver from the ropes. At Hard to Kill, Cage was challenging Rob Van Dam. Cage was too injured to continue after RVD hit a Van Terminator with a chair against Cage’s face. When the officials stopped the match, RVD wanted to keep going, and Daga ran in to protect Cage. RVD attacked Daga, and it became a new match. After the pay-per-view, Cage revealed his Impact Wrestling contract had expired, ending his tenure with the company. Cage also revealed he would be taking time off from wrestling to undergo surgery for an injury.

All Elite Wrestling

FTW Champion (2020–2021)
It was reported on January 12, 2020 that Cage had signed with All Elite Wrestling (AEW). Cage made his debut for the company at the Double or Nothing pay-per-view on May 23, as the surprise final entrant in the Casino Ladder Match, where he was accompanied by his new cornerman Taz, thus establishing himself as a heel. He won the match, thus becoming the number one contender for the AEW World Championship. Afterwards, Taz would crown Cage with the FTW World Championship, an unofficial championship introduced by Taz, and Cage would target Jon Moxley, the AEW World Champion. He would challenge Moxley for the championship at Fight for the Fallen on July 15, but lost after Taz threw in the towel. On the 21 July episode of Dark, Cage formed an alliance with Ricky Starks after they attacked Robert Anthony and Darby Allin after their match. The team, managed by Taz and now known as Team Taz, began feuding with Darby Allin as they faced Allin and Jon Moxley on the July 29 episode of Dynamite where they were defeated. On September 5, Cage competed in the 21-man Casino Battle Royale at All Out, but was eliminated by the eventual winner Lance Archer. On the October 7 episode of Dynamite, Cage successfully defended the FTW Championship when he defeated Will Hobbs. The next month, Hobbs would align himself with Cage, Taz and Starks after he struck Cody Rhodes with Cage's FTW championship belt and then helped them attack both Allin and Rhodes. On the December 2, 2020 special Winter Is Coming, Starks and Hobbs, now known as Powerhouse Hobbs, would lose a tag team match to Cody Rhodes and Darby Allin, after which, Cage, Hobbs, and Starks all attacked Rhodes and Allin until Sting made his AEW debut and ran Team Taz off. At New Year's Smash night two, Cage was defeated by Allin thus failing to win the AEW TNT Championship. On the January 21 edition of Dynamite, it was announced that Cage and Ricky Starks would be facing Darby Allin and Sting in a street fight at Revolution, which they lost.  On the March 17 edition of Dynamite, Brian Cage showed signs of a face turn by coming out and showing respect to Sting much to the annoyance of Taz and the rest of Team Taz. On the April 28 episode of Dynamite, Cage defeated Adam Page, which led to a feud between the two. At Double or Nothing, Cage was defeated by Page. On July 14, 2021, at Fyter Fest night one, Cage lost the FTW World Championship to Ricky Starks after being hit in the head with the title belt by Powerhouse Hobbs, effectively being kicked out of Team Taz and ending his reign at a record-setting of 377 days. Cage and Starks had a rematch for the title on the October 8 episode of Rampage in a Philadelphia street fight, which Cage lost.

Move to Ring of Honor (2022–present)
On April 1, 2022, Cage appeared at Supercard of Honor XV, an event promoted by AEW's sister promotion Ring of Honor (ROH). At the event, Cage was revealed as the new client of Tully Blanchard and defeated Ninja Mack. Cage later aligned with the Gates of Agony (Toa Liona and Kaun) with the group being collectively referred to as "Tully Blanchard Enterprises". On July 23, 2022, at Death Before Dishonor, Prince Nana announced he had purchased Tully Blanchard Enterprises and reformed The Embassy, with Cage, Kaun and Liona. They would go on to defeat the team of Alex Zayne, Blake Christian and Tony Deppen during the preshow. On the November 2nd edition of Rampage, Cage faced Samoa Joe for the ROH World Television Championship in a losing effort. At Final Battle, Cage, Liona and Kaun, defeated Dalton Castle and The Boys, to win the ROH World Six-Man Tag Team Championships.

Personal life
In 2016, Button began dating Melissa Santos, who worked for Lucha Underground as a ring announcer. The couple have a daughter together. The couple married on July 12, 2019. The marriage was also honored during the August and  September Impact Wrestling broadcasts, with the show holding their own ceremony (chaired by Father James Mitchell) following from Cage's on-screen proposal earlier in the tapings. He was previously married to another woman and also has a son from a previous relationship.

Championships and accomplishments

All Elite Wrestling
FTW Championship (1 time)
Casino Ladder Match (2020)
All Pro Wrestling
APW Worldwide Internet Championship (1 time)
Championship Wrestling from Hollywood
NWA Heritage Tag Team Championship (2 times) – with Shaun Ricker
DDT Pro-Wrestling
 Ironman Heavymetalweight Championship (1 time)
Dungeon Championship Wrestling
DCW Heavyweight Championship (1 time)
FEST Wrestling
Love Cup (2017) – with Sami Callihan
Fighting Spirit Pro
FSP World Heavyweight Championship (1 time)
Florida Championship Wrestling
FCW Florida Tag Team Championship (1 time) – with Justin Gabriel
Future Stars of Wrestling
FSW Heavyweight Championship (1 time)
Impact Wrestling
Impact World Championship (1 time)
Impact X Division Championship (1 time)
X Division Star of the Year (2018)
International Wrestling Federation
IWF World Championship (1 time)
Lucha Libre AAA Worldwide
Lucha Libre World Cup (2016 Men's Division) – with Chavo Guerrero Jr. and Johnny Mundo
Lucha Underground
Lucha Underground Gift of the Gods Championship (1 time)
Ultimate Opportunity
Main Event Wrestling
California Cup (2011)
Masters of Ring Entertainment
MORE Wrestling Championship (1 time, current)
Mayhem Wrestling Entertainment
MWE Heavyweight Championship (1 time)
Mach One Wrestling
M1W Tag Team Championship (1 time) – with Shaun Ricker
M1W Tag Team Championship Tournament (2010) – with Shaun Ricker
North America Wrestling
NAW Heavyweight Championship (1 time)
NAW North America Championship (1 time) 
Piledriver Pro Wrestling
PPW Heavyweight Championship (1 time)
Pro Championship Wrestling
PCW Inter-California Championship (1 time)
Pro Wrestling Experience
PWE Heavyweight Championship (1 time)
Pro Wrestling Guerrilla
PWG World Tag Team Championship (1 time) – with Michael Elgin
Pro Wrestling Illustrated
 Most Improved Wrestler of the Year (2019)
Ranked No. 48 of the top 500 singles wrestlers in the PWI 500 in 2019
Pro Wrestling Revolution
PWR Junior Heavyweight Championship (1 time)
PWR Tag Team Championship (2 times) – with Derek Sanders
Ring of Honor
 ROH World Six-Man Tag Team Championship (1 time, current) – with Kaun and Toa Liona
Warrior Wrestling
Warrior Wrestling Champion (1 time) 
WrestleCircus
WC Ringmaster Championship (2 times)
WC Sideshow Championship (1 time)
World Series Wrestling
WSW Heavyweight Championship (1 time)
 WSW Tag Team Championship (1 time, current) – with Flip Gordon
Xtreme Pro Wrestling
 XPW World Heavyweight Championship (1 time)

Luchas de Apuestas record

References

External links

1984 births
21st-century professional wrestlers
All Elite Wrestling personnel
American bodybuilders
American male professional wrestlers
Expatriate professional wrestlers in Japan
Expatriate professional wrestlers in Mexico
Living people
Professional wrestlers from California
Sportspeople from Chico, California
TNA World Heavyweight/Impact World Champions
TNA Gut Check contestants
TNA/Impact X Division Champions
PWG World Tag Team Champions
Lucha Underground Gift of the Gods Champions
Ironman Heavymetalweight Champions
XPW World Heavyweight Champions
FTW Champions
FCW Florida Tag Team Champions
ROH World Six-Man Tag Team Champions